Opisthioparorchis is a genus of trematodes in the family Batrachotrematidae. The separation of Opisthioparorchis and Batrachotrema, originally weakened by the heterogeneity of the former, has been solidified by the separation of species presenting tegumental spines to Opisthioparorchis and those without tegumental spines to Batrachotrema. This differentiation is opposed to that of Wang (1980), who separated Opisthioparorchis on the basis of the relative positioning of the testes and their relation to the internal caeca.

Species
Opisthioparorchis boheaensis Wang, 1980
Opisthioparorchis boulengeris Li, 1997
Opisthioparorchis dehradunensis Rizvi, Bursey & Bhutia, 2012
Opisthioparorchis indica Tandon, Imkongwapang & Prasad, 2005
Opisthioparorchis megaloonos Liang, Ke & Pang, 1990
Opisthioparorchis meixianensis Liang, Ke & Pang, 1990
Opisthioparorchis nanoranae Rizvi, Bursey & Bhutia, 2012
Opisthioparorchis pleurogenitus Wang, 1980
Opisthioparorchis ranae Wang, 1980
Opisthioparorchis vietnamensis (Moravec & Sey, 1989) Rizvi, Bursey & Bhutia, 2012
Opisthioparorchis yaanensis (Zhang & Sha, 1985) Cribb, 2005
Opisthioparorchis yunnanse Li, 1996

References

Plagiorchiida genera